Dandenong railway station is the junction for the Pakenham and Cranbourne lines in Victoria, Australia. It serves the south-eastern Melbourne suburb of Dandenong, and it opened on 8 October 1877.

The station is also serviced by V/Line's Traralgon and Bairnsdale line services.

A number of train stabling sidings are located near the station, including to the north of the station on either side of the railway line, as well as parallel to the platforms. A little used goods yard was once located to the south of the station.

Disused station General Motors is located between Dandenong and Hallam.

History

Dandenong station opened on 8 October 1877, as one of the original stations on the Melbourne to Sale railway line. In 1892, the South Gippsland line opened from Dandenong. Like the suburb itself, the station is named after an Indigenous word believed to mean 'lofty mountains'.

In 1922, electrification from Oakleigh to Dandenong occurred. In 1954, electrification beyond Dandenong was provided, first to Warragul, then eventually onwards to Traralgon. Services beyond Dandenong at the time were generally used by electric L class locomotives, both for passenger services and also for briquettes traffic from the large open cut coal mines in the Latrobe Valley. In 1956, the line was duplicated to Narre Warren.

In 1972, the Down end of Platform 1 was extended. On 19 January 1975, electrified suburban services were extended to Pakenham. Also in that year, the station buildings were rebuilt. 

During 1994-1995, the station was again rebuilt, as part of the Cranbourne electrification project. The rebuild included the demolition of the former Southern Aurora Hotel (completed in May 1993), the removal of the former timber station building (completed in April 1994), and filling in the former pedestrian underpass at the Down end of the station. On 24 March 1995, the rebuilt station was opened by former Prime Minister Paul Keating.

During the 2017/2018 Financial Year, it was the twelfth-busiest station on Melbourne's metropolitan network, with almost 2.2 million passenger movements.

Facilities, platforms and services

Dandenong has one side platform and one island platform with two faces. Access to the platforms is provided by stairs and lifts from an overhead concourse. The side platform (Platform 3) features a kiosk and an enclosed waiting room, containing a customer service window and toilets.

It is serviced by Metro Trains' Pakenham and Cranbourne line services, and by V/Line's Traralgon and Bairnsdale line services.

Platform 1:
  all stations and limited express services to Flinders Street
  all stations and limited express services to Flinders Street

Platform 2:
  all stations and limited express services to Flinders Street
  all stations and limited express services to Flinders Street
  V/Line services to Southern Cross (set down only)

Platform 3:
  all stations services to Pakenham
  all stations services to Cranbourne
  V/Line services to Traralgon and Bairnsdale (pick up only)

Up until mid-late 2019, the unique configuration of the tracks at both ends of the station allowed trains to depart from any platform, in any direction. Since then, Pakenham bound services can no longer depart from Platform 1. 

Future services:
In addition to the current services the Network Development Plan Metropolitan Rail proposes linking the Pakenham and Cranbourne lines to both the Sunbury line and under-construction Melbourne Airport rail link via the Metro Tunnel.
  express services to West Footscray and Sunbury (2025 onwards)
  express services to Melbourne Airport (2029 onwards)

Transport links

Cranbourne Transit operates three routes to and from Dandenong station, under contract to Public Transport Victoria:
 : to Lynbrook station
 : to Casey Central
 : to Cranbourne Park Shopping Centre

Kinetic Melbourne operates one SmartBus route via Dandenong station, under contract to Public Transport Victoria:
  : Frankston station – Melbourne Airport

Ventura Bus Lines operates 21 routes via Dandenong station, under contract to Public Transport Victoria:
 : to Chadstone Shopping Centre
 : to Chadstone Shopping Centre
 : to Chadstone Shopping Centre
 : to Brighton
 : to Brighton
 : to Waverley Gardens Shopping Centre
 : to Springvale South
 : to Noble Park station
: Hampton station – Berwick station
 : to Mossgiel Park (Endeavour Hills)
 : to Doveton
 : to Mossgiel Park (Endeavour Hills)
 : to Brandon Park Shopping Centre
 : to Glen Waverley station
 : to Chelsea station
 : to Endeavour Hills
 : to Chadstone Shopping Centre
  : to Clayton station (Saturday and Sunday mornings only)
  : to Clayton station (Saturday and Sunday mornings only)
  : to Cranbourne station (Saturday and Sunday mornings only)
  : to Cranbourne station (Saturday and Sunday mornings only)

V/Line operates two coach services to and from Dandenong station:
 Cowes
 Inverloch

Gallery

References

External links
 
 Melway map at street-directory.com.au

Premium Melbourne railway stations
Railway stations in Melbourne
Railway stations in Australia opened in 1877
Dandenong, Victoria
Railway stations in the City of Greater Dandenong